Horsefly Peak is the highest summit of the Uncompahgre Plateau in the Rocky Mountains of North America.

See also

List of Colorado mountain ranges
List of Colorado mountain summits
List of Colorado fourteeners
List of Colorado 4000 meter prominent summits
List of the most prominent summits of Colorado
List of Colorado county high points

References

Mountains of Colorado
Mountains of Ouray County, Colorado
North American 3000 m summits